"Come On to Me" is a song by American dancehall trio Major Lazer, from their 2014 extended play Apocalypse Soon. It was produced by Major Lazer and Boaz van de Beatz, and features the vocals of Jamaican artist Sean Paul. The song samples the Trombone Line from "La Murga de Panama", written by Willie Colón and with the original version sung by Hector Lavoe. The single became a hit in Belgium, and also charted in France and the Netherlands.

Music videos 
Two music videos was made for the single. The first video which was animated and does not feature the band nor Paul, was uploaded on the band's official YouTube account on February 18, 2014. It was not intended for television showings as it was labelled an "official stream" than being the official video for the single. The Japanese-inspired second video which does feature the band and Paul was uploaded on the band's official Vevo account on May 20, 2014. The video features taiko drummers, kabuki dancers and geishas. It was directed by Ruben Fleischer.

Charts

Weekly charts

Year-end charts

References

2014 singles
2014 songs
Major Lazer songs
Sean Paul songs
Songs written by Diplo
Songs written by Sean Paul
Songs written by Boaz van de Beatz
Music videos directed by Ruben Fleischer